Abrolophus is a genus of mites in the family Erythraeidae, first described in 1891 by Antonio Berlese. 

It comprises the following species:

Abrolophus aitapensis (Southcott, 1948)
Abrolophus benoni (Haitlinger, 2002)
Abrolophus bohdani (Haitlinger, 2003)
Abrolophus humberti (Haitlinger, 1996)
Abrolophus iraninejadi Saboori & Hajiqanbar, 2005
Abrolophus khanjani (Haitlinger & Saboori, 1996)
Abrolophus longicollis (Oudemans, 1910)
Abrolophus marinensis Haitlinger, 2007
Abrolophus pseudolongicollis (Haitlinger, 1987)
Abrolophus tonsor (Southcott, 1996)
Abrolophus welbourni Yao, Snider, & Snider, 2000
Abrolophus unimiri Haitlinger, 2006

References

Trombidiformes
Trombidiformes genera
Taxa named by Antonio Berlese
Taxa described in 1891